South Norfolk is a constituency represented in the House of Commons of the UK Parliament since 2001 by Richard Bacon, a Conservative.

Constituency profile
This is a rural constituency to the south of Norwich with small market towns and villages. Residents' health and wealth are around average for the UK.

History
Following the Reform Act 1832 the historic county constituency Norfolk was for the first time split into two, two member, county divisions - East Norfolk and West Norfolk.

The Reform Act 1867 led, the following year, to the county's redistribution into three, two member, county divisions.  The three divisions, from the 1868 United Kingdom general election became this one, the North and modified Western division.

The Southern division had its place of election at Norwich. This was the same place of election as the abolished Eastern division. In 1868 the same two MPs who had sat for East Norfolk before its end were re-elected from this constituency.

Under the provisions of the Redistribution of Seats Act 1885, single member constituencies became the norm and greater equalisation in electorate occurred. In Norfolk the three, two member, county divisions were changed to six single member seats. These were this constituency, a revived East Norfolk, Mid Norfolk, North Norfolk, North West Norfolk and South West Norfolk.

The Southern division was very agricultural in character.  The largest town was Diss, which had a population of fewer than 4,000 people in 1900.

Boundaries and boundary changes 

1868–1885: The Hundreds of Walsham, Blofield, Henstead, Humbleyard, Loddon, Clavering, Diss, Deepwade, Earsham, Guiltcross, Shropham, Taverham, Forhoe, and Mitford.

The seat was formed largely from southern parts of the abolished Eastern Division, with a small part transferred from the Western Division.

1885–1918: The Sessional Divisions of Depwade, Diss, Earsham, Loddon and Clavering, and Swainsthorpe.

The northernmost parts were transferred to the re-established Eastern Division and western parts to the new Mid Division. It bordered Mid Norfolk to the west, the borough constituency of Norwich and East Norfolk to the north, the borough of Great Yarmouth and the Suffolk constituency of Lowestoft to the east and another Suffolk division, Eye, to the south.

1918–1950: The Urban District of Diss, the Rural Districts of Depwade, Forehoe, Henstead, and Wayland, and part of the Rural District of Thetford.

Gained southern areas of the abolished Mid Division and a small area in the east of the South-Western Division.  Lost eastern areas, which comprised the Loddon and Clavering Rural District (later renamed the Loddon Rural District), to the Eastern Division.

1950–1974: The Municipal Borough of Thetford, the Urban Districts of Diss and Wymondham, and the Rural Districts of Depwade, Loddon, and Wayland.

These areas combined to produce a somewhat more urban constituency than before. Thetford was transferred from South West Norfolk and the Rural District of Loddon regained from the abolished Eastern Division. The (combined) Rural District of Forehoe and Henstead was transferred to the new County Constituency of Central Norfolk.

1974–1983: The Municipal Borough of Thetford, the Urban Districts of Diss and Wymondham, and the Rural Districts of Depwade, Forehoe and Henstead, Loddon, and Wayland.

Regained the Rural District of Forhoe and Henstead, including Costessey, from Central Norfolk, which was now abolished.

This was the last redistribution before a major reorganisation of local government, which amalgamated many of the smaller local authorities and which was reflected in the 1983 redistribution.

1983–1997: District of South Norfolk.

Thetford and the area comprising the former Rural District of Wayland, including Attleborough, which had been included the District of Breckland, were transferred to the redrawn South West Norfolk constituency.

1997–2010: District of South Norfolk, except the wards of Cringleford and Colney, and New Costessey, which were transferred to Norwich South.

2010–present: District of South Norfolk wards of Beck Vale, Bressingham and Burston, Brooke, Bunwell, Chedgrave and Thurton, Cringleford, Dickleburgh, Diss, Ditchingham and Broome, Earsham, Easton, Forncett, Gillingham, Harleston, Hempnall, Hethersett, Loddon, Mulbarton, Newton Flotman, Old Costessey, Poringland with the Framinghams, Rockland, Roydon, Scole, Stoke Holy Cross, Stratton, Tasburgh, and Thurlton.

Cringleford and Colney (but not New Costessey) transferred back from Norwich South.  Seven District of South Norfolk wards, including Wymondham and surrounding areas, transferred to Mid Norfolk.

Members of Parliament

MPs 1868 – 1885 (two seats)

MPs since 1885 (one seat) 

Notes:-
 a Cozens-Hardy stood at the 1918 United Kingdom general election as a Liberal without the Coalition "coupon", but he took the Coalition Liberal whip when Parliament assembled in 1919.
 b Baker was expelled from the House of Commons in 1954 after being convicted of fraud, forgery and uttering and sentenced to seven years imprisonment.

Elections

Elections in the 2010s

Elections in the 2000s

Elections in the 1990s

Elections in the 1980s

Elections in the 1970s

Elections in the 1960s

Elections in the 1950s

Election in the 1940s

Elections in the 1930s

Elections in the 1920s

Elections in the 1910s

Elections in the 1900s

Elections in the 1890s

Elections in the 1880s

Elections in the 1870s

 
 

 
 

 Caused by Howes' death.

Elections in the 1860s

See also 
 List of parliamentary constituencies in Norfolk

Notes

References

Sources

 Boundaries of Parliamentary Constituencies 1885-1972, compiled and edited by F.W.S. Craig (Parliamentary Reference Publications 1972)
 British Parliamentary Constituencies: A Statistical Compendium, by Ivor Crewe and Anthony Fox (Faber and Faber 1984)
 British Parliamentary Election Results 1832-1885, compiled and edited by F.W.S. Craig (The Macmillan Press 1977)
 British Parliamentary Election Results 1885-1918, compiled and edited by F.W.S. Craig (Macmillan Press 1974)
 British Parliamentary Election Results 1918-1949, compiled and edited by F.W.S. Craig (Macmillan Press, revised edition 1977)
 British Parliamentary Election Results 1950-1973, compiled and edited by F.W.S. Craig (Parliamentary Research Services 1983)
 Social Geography of British Elections 1885-1910. by Henry Pelling (Macmillan 1967)
 Who's Who of British Members of Parliament: Volume I 1832-1885, edited by M. Stenton (The Harvester Press 1976)
 Who's Who of British Members of Parliament, Volume II 1886-1918, edited by M. Stenton and S. Lees (Harvester Press 1978)
 Who's Who of British Members of Parliament, Volume III 1919-1945, edited by M. Stenton and S. Lees (Harvester Press 1979)
 Who's Who of British Members of Parliament, Volume IV 1945-1979, edited by M. Stenton and S. Lees (Harvester Press 1981)

Parliamentary constituencies in Norfolk
Constituencies of the Parliament of the United Kingdom established in 1868